Yemen German Hospital is a hospital in Sana'a, Yemen. It is located in the south of the city, southwest of Al Sabeen Maternal Hospital and immediately south of Fun City along the 60 meters road and Hadda Street.

References

 

Buildings and structures in Sanaa
Hospitals in Yemen